Storia di un minuto ("One minute story") is the first album of the Italian progressive rock band Premiata Forneria Marconi.  It was recorded in Milan and released by the Numero Uno division of RCA Records in Italy. The album topped the Italian album charts after one week from the release – the first time occurrence in the Italian charts up until then.

Storia di un minuto is a progressive rock album with traces of symphonic rock, and borrows influences from a range of genres. Contemporary reviews deemed the album as one of the greatest debuts in the history of prog rock. It includes re-recorded versions of "Impressioni di settembre" b/w "La carrozza di Hans" (previously released as a single). Other songs like "È Festa" (later re-titled as "Celebration") and "Dove... Quando..." went on to become pillars of the band's performances.

Composition and critical reception 

The album follows the lines of progressive rock and symphonic rock, yet it includes elements of other genres, ranging from classical and folk to jazz music. Nevertheless, the style is also eclectic, going from pop-oriented melodies ("Dove...Quando" and "Impressioni di Settembre") to more heavy rock-sounding tracks ("È Festa").

Storia di un minuto was acclaimed in a retrospective Allmusic review, where it was given four-and-a-half out of five stars. In it, Robert Taylor called it an "excellent recording", comparing the album's creativity to fellow British bands, and finally deeming it as "one of the best progressive rock debuts in history [...] essential to any serious collection".

Track listing

Personnel 

 Franco Mussida – electric & acoustic guitar, 12 string guitar, mandocello, lead vocals (tracks 1,2,4 and 6), backing vocals
 Flavio Premoli – organ, piano, Mellotron, harpsichord, Minimoog, lead vocals (tracks 3 and 7), backing vocals
 Mauro Pagani – flute, piccolo, violin, backing vocals
 Giorgio Piazza – bass, backing vocals
 Franz Di Cioccio – drums, Moog synthesizer, gadgets, backing vocals

Release history

References 

Premiata Forneria Marconi albums
1972 debut albums
RCA Records albums
Italian-language albums